The Ligurian language was spoken in pre-Roman times and into the Roman era by an ancient people of north-western Italy and current south-eastern France known as the Ligures.

Very little is known about ancient Ligurian; the lack of inscriptions and the unknown origin of the Ligurian people prevent its certain linguistic classification as a Pre-Indo-European or an Indo-European language. The linguistic hypotheses are mainly based on toponymy and onomastics.

Ancient sources

Strabo indicates that the Ligurians were different from the Celts:

Because of the strong Celtic influences on the language and culture, the Ligurians were known in antiquity as Celto-Ligurians (in Greek  Keltolígues) in some other sources.

Herodotus wrote that sigunnai meant 'hucksters, peddlers' among the Ligurians who lived above Massilia.

Ligurian as a Pre-Indo-European language
Scholars, such as Ernst Gamillscheg, Pia Laviosa Zambotti and Yakov Malkiel, posit that ancient Ligurian was a pre-Indo-European language, with significant late Indo-European influence, especially Celtic (Gallic) and Italic (Latin), superimposed on the original language.
Their thesis is that the Ligurians were survivors of the ancient pre-Indo-European populations that had occupied Europe, at least from the fifth millennium BC. These populations would have had languages of their own families, which they would have preserved until the onset of waves of Indo-European migration. Later, the latter would conquer the territories, imposing their culture and language on the Ligurians.

Ligurian as an Indo-European language and its relationship with Celtic
Xavier Delamarre argues that Ligurian was a Celtic language, similar to, but not the same as, Gaulish. His argument hinges on two points: firstly, the Ligurian place-name Genua (modern Genoa, located near a river mouth) is claimed by Delamarre to derive from PIE *ǵenu-, "chin(bone)". Many Indo-European languages use 'mouth' to mean the part of a river which meets the sea or a lake, but it is only in Celtic for which reflexes of PIE *ǵenu- mean 'mouth'. Besides Genua, which is considered Ligurian, this is found also in Genava (modern Geneva), which may be Gaulish. However, Genua and Genava may well derive from another PIE root with the form *ǵonu-, which means "knee" (so in Pokorny, IEW).

Delamarre's second point is Plutarch's mention that during the Battle of Aquae Sextiae in 102 BC, the Ambrones (who were a Germanic tribe from Jutland) began to shout "Ambrones!" as their battle cry; the Ligurian troops fighting for the Romans, on hearing this cry, found that it was identical to an ancient name in their country which the Ligurians often used when speaking of their descent (outôs kata genos onomazousi Ligues), so they returned the shout, "Ambrones!".

A risk of circular logic has been pointed out – if it is believed that the Ligurians are non-Celtic, and if many place names and tribal names that classical authors state are Ligurian seem to be Celtic, it is incorrect to discard all the Celtic ones when collecting Ligurian words and to use this edited corpus to demonstrate that Ligurian is non-Celtic or non-Indo-European.

The Ligurian-Celtic question is also discussed by Guy Barruol in his 1969 paper The Pre-Roman Peoples of South-East Gaul: Study of Historical Geography.

Ligurian as substrate
French historian and philologist Marie Henri d'Arbois de Jubainville held that Ligurian was the first Indo-European language spoken in Western Europe and was related to Sicel. In his work Premiers Habitants de l'Europe (2nd edition 1889–1894), Jubainville proposed an early Indo-European substrate language for Corsica, Sardinia, eastern Spain, southern France and western Italy, based on the occurrence there of place names ending in -asco, -asca, -usco, -osco, -osca as well as -inco, -inca. For examples of the Corsican toponymy cited by Jubainville, see Prehistory of Corsica.

Other linguists expanded on the idea. Julius Pokorny adapted it as the basis for his Illyro-Venetic theory. Paul Kretschmer saw evidence for Ligurian in Lepontic inscriptions, now seen as Celtic. Hans Krahe, focusing on river names, converted the concept into his theory of the Old European hydronymy.

See also
Prehistory of Corsica

References

Sources
 
 
 
 

Languages of ancient Italy
Extinct languages of Italy
Unclassified Indo-European languages
Unclassified languages of Europe
Ligures
Languages attested from the 3rd century BC
Languages extinct in the 1st century BC
Pre-Indo-European languages
Gallo-Roman culture
Linguistic strata
Italo-Celtic